The 2015 WAC women's basketball tournament was held on March 11–14, 2015, at the Orleans Arena in  Paradise, Nevada.  This was the fourth consecutive year the WAC Tournament took place in Vegas.

Format
Grand Canyon did not compete in the 2015 women's basketball tournament. As a D2 to D1 transitioning school, they were ineligible to compete in the NCAA tournament until the 2018 season, so they could not win the conference tournament since the winner received an automatic bid to the NCAA Tournament. However Grand Canyon was eligible to win the regular season title and is eligible to compete in the WNIT or WBI should they be invited. 

Since Idaho left the WAC at the start of the year, 7 teams competed in the 2015 tournament in a traditional single-elimination style tournament. 1 had a bye in the first round 8, 2 played 7, 3 played 6, and 4 played 5 on Wednesday, March 11. The winners met in the semifinals on Friday, March 13. The championship was held on Saturday, March 14.

Seeds

Schedule

Bracket

Game Summaries

Seattle U vs. Utah Valley
Broadcasters: Mychal Clanton, Steven Hunter, & Evyn Murray

Cal State Bakersfield vs. Chicago State
Broadcasters: Mychal Clanton, Steven Hunter, & Evyn Murray

UT Pan American vs. UMKC
Broadcasters: Mychal Clanton, Steven Hunter, & Evyn Murray

New Mexico State vs. Seattle U
Broadcasters: Mychal Clanton, Steven Hunter, & Evyn Murray

Cal State Bakersfield vs. UT Pan American
Broadcasters: Mychal Clanton, Steven Hunter, & Evyn Murray

Championship: New Mexico State vs. UT Pan American
Broadcasters: Steve Quis & Katie Smith

Awards and honors
Source:  

Tournament MVP: Brianna Freeman – New Mexico State

All-Tournament teams:

 Brianna Freeman – New Mexico State
 Shawnte' Goff – Texas–Pan American
 Tyonna Outland – CSU–Bakersfield
 Taelor Ross – Seattle
 Sasha Weber – New Mexico State

References

WAC women's basketball tournament
WAC women's basketball tournament
March 2015 sports events in the United States
Basketball competitions in the Las Vegas Valley
College basketball tournaments in Nevada
Women's sports in Nevada
College sports tournaments in Nevada